John F. Kennedy High School (JFKHS) is a four-year public high school located in Granada Hills, Los Angeles, in the U.S. state of California. It is in District 1 of the Los Angeles Unified School District.

History
The school was relieved of overcrowding when Valley Region High School 4 and Valley Region High School 5 opened in 2011.

The new principal is Dr. Richard Chavez.

Academic programs 
John F. Kennedy High School has different programs for students and/or parents who are intrigued. Kennedy has three magnet programs, which prepare students for the future. There is an Architecture, Digital Design & Filmmaking Magnet, a Highly Gifted/High-Ability Medical Magnet, and a Global Leadership & Environmental Action Magnet (GLEAM). Architecture, Digital Design & Filmmaking Magnet, . There are also Advanced Placement Application (AP) classes students can take to develop preparation for college. All AP classes can contribute to college credit if AP tests are passed with a score of 3 or higher. Advancement Via Individual Determination (AVID), Bilingual Program, Impact, Freshman Transition Program, The Carl D. Perkins Program, School for Advanced Studies, Teaching Academy, and Kennedy High School Work Experience Program are other programs that are offered by the school.

Extracurricular activities

Sports 
There are several sports available for students to join, such as: football, Marching Band, color guard,  golf, cross country, volleyball, tennis, basketball, soccer, baseball, softball, track, water polo and swim. There are both girls and boys teams for golf, volleyball, tennis, and soccer.

Clubs 
There are a variety of clubs for students who are looking for something to keep them involved and interested while attending school, ranging from Anime Club to ASB Student Government.

Academies
There is a Teaching Academy available for students:
 Teaching Academy

College Center 
The college center is available for seniors and all other students who can use help and/or advice about their future. The college center gives information about college applications, personal statements, it also holds workshops to help students fill out college applications, scholarships, FAFSA and resumes. An important calendar is provided for seniors so deadlines are not missed.

School based clinic 
Kennedy's school based clinic, also known as Hathaway-Sycamores, CFS, El Nido Family Center, is available for Kennedy students as well as the students' family members from ages 2 to 18. Some of the services available include physicals, lab work, and counseling.

Notable alumni 
 Garret Anderson, Major League Baseball player
 Jack Cassel, Major League Baseball player
 Rashied Davis, professional football player
 Darren Daye, professional basketball player
 Jon Garland, Major League Baseball player
 Cuba Gooding Jr., actor
 Stuart Gray, professional basketball player
Wendy Greuel, Los Angeles Controller and City Council member
 Jacob Hopkins, actor
 Denean Howard, Olympic track athlete
 Sherri Howard, Olympic track athlete
 Dion Lambert, professional football player
 Mark McMillian, professional football player
 Michaele Pride-Wells (born 1956), architect and educator
Mike Pringle, Canadian Football League player
 Tom Ramsey, professional football player
 Terrmel Sledge, Major League Baseball player

See also
 List of memorials to John F. Kennedy

References 

Kennedy
High schools in the San Fernando Valley
High schools in Los Angeles
Public high schools in California
Granada Hills, Los Angeles
Monuments and memorials to John F. Kennedy in the United States
1971 establishments in California
Educational institutions established in 1971